Carlo Vecchione (born 27 June 1988 in Naples) is an Italian professional football player. Currently, he plays in the Ligue 2 for Clermont Foot on loan from Italian giants Juventus F.C.

Career

Juventus
Vecchione started his career working his way through the Juventus youth ranks, before he made his way to the "Primavera" youth squad in 2008. He never managed a senior team debut with Juventus during the season, but after graduating the youth team in July 2009, he was loaned out to French side, Clermont Foot. After one season with the club, he has made 7 appearances, and has returned to Juventus on May 31, 2010.

References
http://www.goal.com
https://web.archive.org/web/20110717084650/http://www.transfremarketweb.com/
http://www.juventus.com
https://web.archive.org/web/20070923020802/http://www.soccerway.net/

1988 births
Living people
Italian footballers
Italian expatriate footballers
Expatriate footballers in France
Italian expatriate sportspeople in France
Juventus F.C. players
Ligue 2 players
Clermont Foot players
Association football midfielders